Reverend Moses Akaranga is a Kenyan politician who served as the first governor of Vihiga county having been defeated by Dr. Wilberforce Ottichilo in August 2017. He is also former Member of parliament for Sabatia constituency, having defeated Musalia Mudavadi of KANU from the Sabatia Constituency seat in the 2002 elections on a Ford-Kenya ticket. He served only one term and was defeated by Mudavadi, who was now representing Orange Democratic Movement at the 2007 elections.

He is the first Kenyan Member of Parliament to unseat a sitting Vice President.

political career
In 2002, he was elected as M.P for Sabatia
Constituency. He served as a Commissioner
with the Parliamentary Service Commission
and was the Chairperson of the
Parliamentary Staff Welfare Committee. In
2003, he was appointed as Assistant
Minister for Agriculture and in 2004 became
Minister of State for Public Service in the
Office of the President. During his tenure as
a Minister, Kenya was awarded the
prestigious United Nations Public Service
Award. He initiated Performance
Contracting in the Public Service,
introduced the Rapid Results Initiative
program (RRI), oversaw the review of civil
servant salaries and the increment of
pensions to all retired civil servants. He
has also served as the vice chairman of the
Humanitarian Settlement Fund. He
previously worked as a Senior Business
Manager at Barclays Bank of Kenya Limited
thereafter working with the [[Pentecostal
Assemblies of Kenya]] (P.A.G. Kenya) as the
General Administrator. In Kenya’s 2013
general election, Moses vied in the
gubernatorial elections, winning as
Governor of Vihiga County, alongside
Deputy Governor Caleb Temba Amaswache.
He was elected on a PPK party ticket.

References

Living people
County Governors of Kenya
Members of the National Assembly (Kenya)
1953 births